The Prusa Mini, sometimes stylized as the Original Prusa MINI, is an open-source fused deposition modeling 3D printer that is manufactured by the Czech company Prusa Research. The printer is the lowest cost machine produced by Prusa Research and is designed as a first printer or as part of a 'print farm'.

Specifications

Mini 

The Prusa Mini was officially launched in October 2019. The printer is available either assembled or as a kit. The build volume is 180 x 180 x 180 mm, and the print is performed on a spring steel sheet which meant to be easy to remove. Minimum layer resolution is 50 micrometers, and the maximum print speed is 200 millimeters per second. The printer has an LCD color display (non-touch), is able to print via USB drives. It has a custom 32-bit mainboard and a built-in online firmware updater. The printer has sensorless homing using Trinamic 2209 drivers and has a custom hot end which supports E3D nozzles.

It has several safety features including three thermistors to detect thermal runaway.

The printer is the first open source hardware product to require a user wishing to use unsigned firmware to physically break off a piece of the PCB, voiding the printer's warranty, before it can be flashed onto the board.  This made sure Prusa wasn't liable for damage caused by printers instructed to behave in an unendorsed manner by custom firmware (such as disabling thermal runaway protections or other safety features).

Mini+ 
In November 2020, the Prusa Mini was replaced by the Mini+, which had a few small updates meant to ease assembly and maintenance. One of the changes was a new mesh bed levelling sensor called "SuperPINDA" which replaced the previous "MINDA" sensor, and it is claimed by the manufacturer that this should result in a more consistent calibration of the first print layer in particular.

See also 
 Prusa i3

References

External links 
 Prusa Research

Open hardware electronic devices
3D printing
RepRap project
Czech brands